Pearse Valley is an ice-free valley  long, lying immediately west of Catspaw Glacier, at the south side of the Asgard Range in Victoria Land. Named by Advisory Committee on Antarctic Names (US-ACAN) for John S. Pearse, biologist at McMurdo Station, 1961, and the season 1961–62.

Valleys of Victoria Land
McMurdo Dry Valleys